South Kynouria ( – Notia Kynouria) is a municipality in the Arcadia regional unit, Peloponnese, Greece. The seat of the municipality is the town of Leonidio. The municipality has an area of 592.439 km2. It covers the central part of the ancient region of Cynuria (the southeast coastal area of the Peloponnese) and the southern part of the former Kynouria Province.

Municipality
The municipality South Kynouria was formed at the 2011 local government reform by the merger of the following 3 former municipalities, that became municipal units:
Kosmas
Leonidio
Tyros

References

Municipalities of Peloponnese (region)
Populated places in Arcadia, Peloponnese